Boone Narr (born January 30, 1948) is an internationally known and respected animal stunt coordinator and one of the most celebrated Hollywood animal trainers. He is founder of the Boone's Animals for Hollywood animal training facility located in Castaic, California. Boone Narr is a Vietnam veteran and got into the entertainment industry in 1971.

Training

Boone Narr has been credited as an animal trainer, wrangler and supplier for a number of films and television programmes.

Animals trained at Boone's Animals for Hollywood have also been featured in many other television series, including CSI: Crime Scene Investigation, Ugly Betty and Criminal Minds.

Boone's Animals for Hollywood has also trained and supplied animals for a number of television commercials, including such brands as Budweiser, Disneyland, Walmart, John Deere, McDonald's, Cisco Systems, FedEx, Hewlett-Packard and American Express, among others.

It was reported in the Los Angeles Times that on the set of Narr's first film Any Which Way You Can, Clint Eastwood's sidekick orangutan "Clyde" (originally named "Buddha") was "trained with a can of mace and a pipe wrapped in newspaper." The article actually drew from a book by Dale Peterson and Jane Goodall, who claimed that information from three observers suggested that the orangutan was frequently beaten, and that, some time toward the completion of the film, Buddha was punished for having stolen doughnuts from the set. They state that he was beaten for 20 minutes with a three-and-a-half foot ax handle, and that, after his death some months later, an autopsy suggested evidence of a cerebral hemorrhage. Makeup effects artist William Munns has cast doubt on these claims, saying that Narr was "truly one of the best and kindest trainers I knew."

Films

Television 
 Mad About You (1992-99)
 When Animals Attack! 3/4 (1997)
 Grey's Anatomy (2005–2008)
 Dollhouse (2009)
 Sons of Anarchy (2008-2009)
 Californication (2007-2009)
 Private Practice (2008-2010)
 House M.D. (2007-2010)
 Sons of Tucson (2010)
 True Blood (2008-2010)
 Friends with Benefits (2011)
 Enlightened (2011)

Maui, who played Murray the dog in Mad About You, was discovered by Boone Narr at the Castaic Animal Shelter along with its mother Bingo, who starred in the 1991 film Bingo. Maui was twice voted the most popular dog by the readers of TV Guide.

References

External links 
 boonesanimals.com Boone's Animals for Hollywood
 

Animal trainers
People from Castaic, California
1948 births
Living people
Place of birth missing (living people)